2×4 is the third album by Guadalcanal Diary. It was released in 1987.

The album peaked at No. 183 on the Billboard 200.

Critical reception
Trouser Press called the album "smashing," writing that the band members "dip into their shadowy art-rock pasts ... to finally create music as distinctive as the lyrics."

AllMusic wrote that 2×4 "sounds like the group's strongest and most confident album." Paste included the album at No. 64 on its list of "The 80 Best Albums of the 1980s".

Track listing
 "Litany (Life Goes On)" (Attaway) – 3:41
 "Under the Yoke" (Walls) – 4:28
 "Get over It" (Attaway/Crowe) – 3:00
 "Little Birds" (Attaway) – 3:57
 "Things Fall Apart" (Attaway/Poe/Walls) – 2:44
 "Let the Big Wheel Roll" (Walls) – 2:40
 "And Your Bird Can Sing" (Lennon–McCartney) – 2:07
 "Where Angels Fear to Tread" (Walls) – 3:13
 "Newborn" (Attaway) – 4:41
 "Winds of Change" (Walls) – 2:55
 "Say Please" (Attaway) – 2:10
 "3 AM" (Attaway/Walls) – 4:12
 "Lips of Steel" (Attaway/Walls) – 3:28

Bonus tracks
"Home [Joe Blaney Mix]" – 2:42
"Shango" – 4:29
"It's Time" – 2:30
"Carrying the Torch (demo version)" – 2:56
"Just an Excuse (demo version)" – 3:03
"Lips of Steel (demo version)" – 3:36
"Under the Yoke (demo version)" – 3:04
"Winds of Change (demo version)" – 3:21
"Get Over It (demo version)" – 2:18
"3 A.M. (demo version)" – 3:53
"Tutti-Frutti (demo version)" – 1:52

Personnel
 Terry Allen – photography
 Murray Attaway – guitar, harmonica, vocals
 Joe Blaney – mixing
 Rhett Crowe – bass guitar
 Don Dixon – producer
 Guadalcanal Diary – artwork
 George Pappas – engineer
 John Poe – drums, vocals
 Dan Vaganek – engineer
 Jeff Walls – guitar, keyboards, vocals, kalimba, lap steel guitar

Charts

Album
Billboard (North America)

References 

Guadalcanal Diary (band) albums
1987 albums
Albums produced by Don Dixon (musician)
Elektra Records albums